is a Japanese football player and plays for Kochi United SC of the Japan Football League.

Club statistics
Updated to 20 February 2020.

References

External links

Profile at Kochi United SC

1989 births
Living people
Association football people from Hiroshima Prefecture
Japanese footballers
J1 League players
J2 League players
J3 League players
Japan Football League players
Sanfrecce Hiroshima players
Gainare Tottori players
Kochi United SC players
Association football midfielders